Wheeling is a village in Cook and Lake counties in the U.S. state of Illinois. Per the 2020 census, the population was 39,137. Wheeling is named for Wheeling, West Virginia.

History 
The land that is now Wheeling, Illinois, was controlled by the Miami Confederacy which contained the Illini and Kickapoo tribes) starting in the early 1680s. The Confederacy was driven from the area by the Iroquois and Fox in the early 1700s.

The French-allied Potawatomi began to raid and take possession of Northern Illinois in the 1700s. In the late 1700s and early 1800s, the Potawatomi expanded southwards from their territory in Green Bay and westward from their holdings in Detroit, until they controlled in an L-shaped swath of territory from Green Bay to the Illinois River, and from the Mississippi River to the Maumee River.

The descendants of the Potawatomi who once inhabited the land that is now Wheeling currently live on a reservation in Mayette, Kansas.

The first cabin in Wheeling Township was built by a Mr. Sweet in 1833. He sold it to George Strong for $60, making Mr. Strong the first permanent resident in Wheeling Township.

In 1834, Joseph Filkins opened the first tavern-hotel in the township at the intersection of Dundee Road and Milwaukee Avenue. By 1835, there were 18 cabins in the township, and a post office was established in Filkins’ Tavern.

In 1837, Russell Wheeler and Charles Daniels opened a general store and trading post next to Filkins’ Tavern. The settlers who migrated to that area formed the Village of East Wheeling, which later became known as simply Wheeling.

Geography

Climate
The climate in Wheeling can be classified as temperate. Winters are usually very cold and snowy. Summers are often hot and humid, but can be pleasantly warm as well. Precipitation is uniformly distributed throughout the year.

Demographics
As of the 2020 census there were 39,137 people, 15,148 households, and 9,673 families residing in the village. The racial makeup of the village was 50.33% White, 2.36% African American, 1.42% Native American, 16.73% Asian, 0.02% Pacific Islander, 17.32% from other races, and 11.84% from two or more races. Hispanic or Latino of any race were 33.34% of the population.

There were 15,148 households, out of which 45.13% had children under the age of 18 living with them, 48.45% were married couples living together, 9.84% had a female householder with no husband present, and 36.14% were non-families. 29.69% of all households were made up of individuals, and 10.87% had someone living alone who was 65 years of age or older. The average household size was 3.15 and the average family size was 2.52.

The village's age distribution consisted of 19.9% under the age of 18, 6.4% from 18 to 24, 33.2% from 25 to 44, 24.6% from 45 to 64, and 16.0% who were 65 years of age or older. The median age was 38.4 years. For every 100 females, there were 94.4 males. For every 100 females age 18 and over, there were 93.2 males.

The median income for a household in the village was $71,966, and the median income for a family was $83,406. Males had a median income of $45,470 versus $36,478 for females. The per capita income for the village was $36,999. About 5.6% of families and 8.2% of the population were below the poverty line, including 12.0% of those under age 18 and 8.8% of those age 65 or over.

Note: the US Census treats Hispanic/Latino as an ethnic category. This table excludes Latinos from the racial categories and assigns them to a separate category. Hispanics/Latinos can be of any race.

Economy

A famous hotel called the Union Hotel used to be located on Milwaukee Avenue. It was built in 1856 and reconstructed following a fire in 1925. Over the years, the building evolved into several restaurants. Billy and Company, a restaurant, was the last occupant of the building, which was torn down in 1996 to make way for Union Commons condominiums.

Camp Ramah, a Jewish day camp, is located in Wheeling.

Wheeling was home to video game company Jaleco USA and to the American branch of Taito.

The Korean Cultural Center of Chicago is located in Wheeling.

Arts and culture
Wheeling is served by the Indian Trails Public Library District and Prospect Heights Public Library District.

Education

Primary and secondary schools
Wheeling Community Consolidated School District 21 is located in Wheeling. It comprises five elementary schools and three middle schools. Elementary schools include Walt Whitman Elementary School, Robert Frost Elementary School, Booth Tarkington Elementary School, Mark Twain Elementary School and Eugene Field Elementary School. Middle schools include Oliver Wendell Holmes Middle School and Jack London Middle School.

In addition to students from District 21, a small portion of students attend schools in Prospect Heights School District 23. Schools in this district include Betsy Ross Elementary School (2-3), Anne Sullivan Elementary School (4-5), Dwight D. Eisenhower Elementary School (PreK-1) and Douglas MacArthur Middle School (6-8).

Most Wheeling students attend Wheeling High School, though a portion of Wheeling students attend Buffalo Grove High School. Both schools belong to Township High School District 214, which is Illinois' second largest high school district by enrollment.

Students can also attend one of many private schools in town or in the area. J. Slowacki School serves pre-kindergarten through 11th grade. East Capitol High School serves grades 9-12. St. Viator High School also serves grades 9-12. St. Joseph the Worker school was formerly a Catholic grade school which served grades K-8. St. Alphonsus Ligouri School is also a Catholic grade school which serves K-8 in nearby Prospect Heights which serves Wheeling and which is also located in Wheeling High School's boundaries.

Colleges and universities
National Louis University is an accredited, private, non-profit undergraduate and graduate institution of higher learning, organized in colleges of education, arts and sciences, and business and management. Worsham College of Mortuary Science is an accredited, private institution offering associate degrees and diplomas in mortuary science. William Rainey Harper College, based in Palatine, is the community college serving Wheeling.

Other education
The Consulate-General of South Korea in Chicago maintains the Korean Education Center in Wheeling.

Infrastructure

Transportation
Wheeling has a station on Metra's North Central Service, which provides daily commuter rail service between Antioch and Chicago Union Station Monday through Friday.

Chicago Executive Airport, a busy general aviation airport, is located in Wheeling and Prospect Heights and jointly run by both villages. Formerly known as Palwaukee Municipal Airport, it is the third busiest airport in Illinois, after Chicago's O'Hare and Midway airports.

Notable people

 John Francis Daley, actor
 Mark Newman, executive with New York Yankees
 Dan Patlak, former commissioner of the Cook County Board of Review
 Haley Reinhart, singer
 Mike Rucinski, ice hockey center
 Deborah Voigt, opera singer

References

External links

 Village of Wheeling
 Wheeling Park District
 Indian Trails Library District

 
Villages in Cook County, Illinois
Villages in Lake County, Illinois
1894 establishments in Illinois
Majority-minority cities and towns in Cook County, Illinois
Majority-minority cities and towns in Lake County, Illinois